Clone Manager is a commercial bioinformatics software work suite of Sci-Ed, that supports molecular biologists with data management and allows them to perform certain in silico preanalysis.

This type of bioinformatics software is used for managing, analyzing and visualizing DNA and protein sequence data essential for molecular biology.

For enzyme read control, sequence processing of identical individuals, cloning simulation, graphic map drawing, primer design and analysis, global and local sequence alignment, similarity search, laboratory scale sequence assembly projects A comprehensive set of tools.

References

External links 
 http://www.scied.com Sci-Ed homepage

Bioinformatics software
Cloning
Molecular biology

 https://www.tegakari.net/en/2020/07/clone-manager/ Data management/analysis software "Clone Manager" for gene research in molecular biology